The Church of St Deinst, Llangarron, Herefordshire is a church of the Diocese of Hereford, England. The church is dedicated to the Celtic saint Deiniol and is the only church in England to bear such a dedication. It is an active parish church and a Grade I listed building.

History
St Deiniol was a 6th century Celtic ecclesiastic, traditionally recorded as the first Bishop of Bangor. His name is variously rendered as Denoual, Deinst, and Daniel. Church dedications to the saint are rare, St Deinst's in Llangarron being the only such occurrence in England. The origins of the church at Llangarron were as a possession of Monmouth Priory. The present structure was mostly constructed in the 14th century, with restorations in the 19th and early 20th centuries. The 14th century work was probably a reconstruction of an earlier wooden church, dating from the 11th century. The later restorations were undertaken by George Pearson in 1841 and by John Pollard Seddon in 1900–1901.

The church remains an active parish church in the Diocese of Hereford. Refurbishment of the building took place in 2009, supported by a grant from the National Churches Trust. The redevelopment included the construction of a community hub, the Garron Centre.

The church is part of 'The Borders Group of Parishes'. The benefice comprises Goodrich with Welsh Bicknor, Marstow, Llangarron, Llangrove and Welsh Newton with Llanrothal.

In recent years the church has held a number of concerts, including a Baroque Concert "The Am’rous Flute", Hereford Concert Band who performed the Big Band sound, Chepstow Male Voice Choir, the Charles Medlam viola da gamba lunchtime recital and the Liberty Street Jazz Band. In 2010 the church was the venue for a Medieval Mystery Play which played to a packed audience.

Architecture and description
The church is built of Old Red Sandstone, in part carved ashlar and in part rubble infill. The building comprises a nave, chancel, and a tower with an external stair turret. The style is Perpendicular Gothic. Alan Brooks, in his 2012 Herefordshire Pevsner, notes the "substantial" font and the Jacobean pulpit. The 14th-century font is octagonal in shape and perpendicular in design, with carved quatrefoils on the bowl and tracery and fleurons on the stem.

The church contains an early carving, originally thought to be medieval tombstone commemorating a child, but also believed to be Romano-British in date. It is possibly a depiction of Deiniol.

Listing designations
The church is a Grade I listed building. The interior, and the churchyard, contain an unusually large number of listed memorials, all designated Grade II. These include memorials to: Edward Tovey, Richard Knight, Silvaus Taner, the Mathews family, and two named family members, James and William, Edward, Benjamin, and William, all of the Watkins family, the Godwin family, Kate Hartland, Edmund Miles, Hannah Smith, Thomas and Elizabeth Smith, Thomas Wood, two memorials to members of the Woodward family, the Jones family, Walter and Mary Mayos, Mary Miles, Mary Philpotts, Mary Evans, another Mary Evans, Mary Williams, Thomas Carrier, Edward Taylor, two members of the Peake family, and the Gunters.

Other Grade II structures include a sundial which originally formed the tip of the spire and which was removed and reconfigured by Seddon, and three unidentified chest tombs.

Gallery

Notes

References

Sources
 

Church of England church buildings in Herefordshire
Llangarron
14th-century church buildings in England